P. ferruginea may refer to:
 Pimenta ferruginea, a plant species endemic to Cuba
 Prumnopitys ferruginea, the Miro, an evergreen coniferous tree species endemic to New Zealand
 Pseudomyrmex ferruginea, the acacia ant, an insect species
 Pterocerina ferruginea, a picture-winged fly species
 Puya ferruginea, a plant species native to Bolivia and Ecuador

Synonyms
 Pinalia ferruginea, a synonym for Eria ferruginea, an orchid species

See also
 Ferruginea (disambiguation)